The following is a list of schools in Northern Province, Sri Lanka. The province is divided into 12 education zones which are sub-divided into 33 education divisions. There are around 1,000 schools in the province. 11 schools are national schools, 6 are fee paying private schools and the remainder are provincial schools (including non-fee paying assisted private schools and pirivena).

See also
List of schools in Sri Lanka

References and footnotes
 
  

Northern Province